Kunemo Rupa Amini (28 November 1964 – 29 September 2021) was a Papua New Guinean cricketer. She was the captain of the Papua New Guinea women's national cricket team from 2006 to 2009, including at the 2008 Women's Cricket World Cup Qualifier, the team's first international appearance. She was one of the team's leading batters.

Amini's sons CJ and Chris Amini also represented PNG in cricket. She died suddenly in Port Moresby on 29 September 2021.

References

External links 

1964 births
2021 deaths
Papua New Guinean women cricketers
People from Morobe Province